High School Musical: Makin' the Cut! is a video game based on the 2006 television movie High School Musical available for the Nintendo DS. It was featured on Disney 365, airing on Disney Channel, hosted by Chester at the time.

Gameplay
The main game's gameplay is a takeoff of the Japanese rhythm game Osu!.

Songs are sung by cover artists, and not the original artists. 

It starts when Sharpay signed up the gang auditioning for a national music competition. They have problems in between (i.e.: Taylor thinking Chad is cheating on her, while Chad was just scared of heights since the other part of the competition would be held at a high altitude).

There are three different types of gameplay: Dance, music, and video making showdowns.

Songs
 The Alphabet Song
 Start of Something New
 Get'cha Head in the Game
 What I've Been Looking For
 What I've Been Looking For (Reprise)
 Stick to the Status Quo
 Simple And Clean 
 When There Was Me and You
 Bop to the Top
 Breaking Free
 I Can't Take My Eyes Off of You
 We're All in This Together
 What Time Is It?
 I Don't Dance
 The Boys Are Back

Reception

The game has a score of 69.25% from GameRankings and 67 out of 100 from Metacritic based on "mixed or average reviews".

See also
High School Musical
High School Musical 2
High School Musical 3: Senior Year
High School Musical: El desafio (Argentina)

References

External links 
IGN page   
    

2001 video games
Makin' the Cut!
Music video games
Nintendo DS games
Nintendo DS-only games
Behaviour Interactive games
Video games developed in Canada